Lācis (Old orthography: Lahz(i)(s); feminine: Lāce) is a Latvian surname, derived from the Latvian word for "bear". Individuals with the surname include:

Asja Lācis (1891–1979), Latvian actress 
Dzintars Lācis (1940–1992), Latvian cyclist
Kārlis Lācis (born 1977), Latvian composer
Vilis Lācis (1904-1966), Latvian author and Premier of Latvian SSR

See also 
Latsis, same surname, transliterated from Russian

Latvian-language masculine surnames